William Henry Powell FRIBA (1847 - 7 June 1900) was an architect primarily based in London and South Africa.

Architectural career
He was articled to Joseph Gardner of Folkestone from 1864 to 1867 and remained as his assistant until he moved to be assistant to Sydney Smirke for one year. He later formed a partnership with John Ladds as Ladds and Powell which lasted until around 1890 when he emigrated to South Africa.

In South Africa he set up a practice in Durban. On his death in 1900, his eldest son William continued the practice in Durban.

He was nominated ARIBA in 1873 and FRIBA in 1887.

Personal life
He was born in 1847 in Lewes, Sussex, the son of Revd. William Powell (b. 1810) and Matilda Spencer Blaine (1810 - 1891).

He married Clara Welch (1852 - 1920), daughter of J.D. Welch of Herne Hill on 23 April 1873 at St Paul's Church, Herne Hill, and they had four sons:
William Powell (b. 1874)
Sydney Powell (b. 1877)
John Stewart Powell (b. 1885)
Owen Powell (b. 1886)

In 1889 he was cited in a divorce case by Ralph Thomas, a solicitor in practice in Chancery Lane on the grounds of his wife's adultery with Powell. To escape the ensuing scandal, in 1890 he moved with his family to Ridge Road, Morningside, Durban, South Africa.

Works
The Corn Exchange, Bedford 1872-74
Chorley Town Hall, Lancashire 1875
Terrace of shops and flats, 125-9 Mount Street, London 1886-87 Grade II listed
Durban Club 1890
Public Baths, Field Street, Durban 1891
Durban High School 1894
Victoria Club, Langalibalele Street, Durban, 1895
Victoria Hall, Maritzburg College, 1897
Old Colonial Building, Pietermaritzburg, South Africa 1897 - 1901

References

1847 births
1900 deaths
British architects
19th-century English architects
Associates of the Royal Institute of British Architects
Fellows of the Royal Institute of British Architects
People from Lewes